is a Japanese former swimmer. She competed in two events at the 1976 Summer Olympics.

References

External links
 

1959 births
Living people
Japanese female backstroke swimmers
Olympic swimmers of Japan
Swimmers at the 1976 Summer Olympics
Place of birth missing (living people)
Asian Games medalists in swimming
Asian Games silver medalists for Japan
Swimmers at the 1978 Asian Games
Medalists at the 1978 Asian Games
20th-century Japanese women
21st-century Japanese women